Anthony Francis Barrow (19 October 1971 – 16 March 2017) was an English rugby league footballer who played for Oldham RLFC (Heritage № 963) and Swinton Lions.

Following his retirement in 2001, Barrow became a personal trainer.

Barrow was the son of Tony Barrow, Sr. who played for St. Helens and Leigh in the 1960s, and 1970s.

He died aged 45 of cancer.

References 

1971 births
2017 deaths
Deaths from brain cancer in England
English rugby league players
Oldham R.L.F.C. players
Rugby league players from St Helens, Merseyside
Swinton Lions players